C. W. Francis Everitt (born 8 March 1934) is a US-based English physicist working on experimental testing of general relativity.

Everitt was educated at Imperial College London and the University of Pennsylvania in low-temperature physics. He is Professor at the Hansen Experimental Physics Laboratory of Stanford University and is also an Associate Member of the Kavli Institute for Particle Astrophysics and Cosmology (KIPAC).

Everitt is Principal Investigator of the Gravity Probe B mission mainly aimed to test frame-dragging at an expected accuracy of 1%. According to general relativity, it is an effect induced by the rotation of the Earth on orbiting gyroscopes. Everitt spent more than 40 years on the project and was awarded with the NASA Distinguished Public Service Medal. The results were published in Physical Review Letters in May 2011. The results confirm general relativity's predictions, though not to the project's ambitious goal of 1% precision.

In 1985, along with Remo Ruffini, Riccardo Giacconi, Abdus Salam, Paul Boynton, George Coyne, and Fang Li-Zhi, Professor Everitt co-founded the International Center for Relativistic Astrophysics. Everitt is the current Chairman of the ICRANet Steering Committee for the ICRANet Center at the Leland Stanford Junior University.

Bibliometric information 
As of November 2013, according to the NASA ADS database, the h-index of C.W.F. Everitt is 18, with a total number of citations (self-citations excluded) of about 900. The tori index and the riq index are 12.1 and 62, respectively.

References

External links
Prof. Everitt webpage
NASA Distinguished Public Service Medal to Francis Everitt
Gravity Probe B homepage

1934 births
Living people
English physicists
Alumni of Imperial College London
Stanford University Department of Physics faculty